Sir Odo William Theophilus Russell  (3 May 1870 – 23 December 1951) was a British diplomat who was ambassador to Switzerland, the Vatican and the Netherlands.

Background
Russell was the second son of Odo Russell, later the first Baron Ampthill, by Lady Emily Villiers, daughter of George Villiers, 4th Earl of Clarendon.

Career
Russell entered the Diplomatic Service in 1892 and served in Rome, Athens, St Petersburg, Berlin, Buenos Aires and Vienna, where he held the rank of counsellor from 1909 to 1915. He was then Diplomatic Secretary to the Secretary of State for Foreign Affairs from 1915 to 1919, Minister at Bern from 1919 to 1922, Minister to the Holy See from 1922 to 1928 and Minister at The Hague from 1928 to 1933 (the last three posts were equivalent to modern ambassadorships). He was appointed Commander of the Royal Victorian Order (CVO) in 1909, Companion of the Order of the Bath (CB) in 1916, Knight Commander of the Royal Victorian Order (KCVO) in 1923 and Knight Commander of the Order of St Michael and St George (KCMG) in 1926.

Family
In 1910, while he was stationed in Vienna, Russell married Countess Marie Louise Rex, daughter of Count Rex, the Saxon Minister at the Austro-Hungarian Court. They had three sons.

Russell and his wife, the Countess, are buried in the churchyard of St Michael's, Chenies, together with other members of the Russell family.

References
RUSSELL, Hon. Sir Odo (William Theophilus Villiers), Who Was Who, A & C Black, 1920–2008; online edn, Oxford University Press, Dec 2007, accessed 11 April 2012

External links

1870 births
1951 deaths
Odo William Theophilus Villiers
Younger sons of barons
Ambassadors of the United Kingdom to Switzerland
Ambassadors of the United Kingdom to the Holy See
Ambassadors of the United Kingdom to the Netherlands
Knights Commander of the Order of St Michael and St George
Knights Commander of the Royal Victorian Order
Companions of the Order of the Bath
O